The Rubinoos was the 1977 debut album by American power pop band the Rubinoos.  It was rereleased a number of times on different labels with bonus tracks.  The Rubinoos re-released it again on their own label, November 30, 2011 (bonus tracks listed below).

Track listing 
 "I Think We're Alone Now" (Bo Gentry, Richie Cordell) - 2:52
 "Leave My Heart Alone" (James Gangwer, Tommy Dunbar) - 2:37
 "Hard to Get" (Gangwer, Dunbar) - 3:02
 "Peek-A-Boo" (Jack Hammer) - 2:09
 "Rock and Roll is Dead" (Alex Carlin, Jon Rubin, Dunbar) - 2:50
 "Memories" (Dunbar) - 5:32
 "Nothing a Little Love Won't Cure" (Dunbar) - 2:37
 "Wouldn't It Be Nice" (Gangwer, Dunbar) - 3:21
 "Make It Easy" (Dunbar) - 3:02
 "I Never Thought It Would Happen" (Royse Ader, Gangwer, Dunbar) - 2:33

Bonus Tracks
 "Rhythm of Love" (Bonus Track)
 "As Long As I'm With You" (Bonus Track)
 "Gorilla" (Bonus Track)
 "Animal Farm" (Bonus Track)
 "Eyes On Love" (Bonus Track)
 "Cats and Dogs" (Bonus Track)

Personnel 
The Rubinoos
Jon Rubin — lead vocals, rhythm guitar
Tommy Dunbar — lead guitar, backing vocals, keyboards; lead vocals on "Rock and Roll is Dead"
Royse Ader — bass, backing vocals
Donn Spindt — drums, backing vocals, percussion; lead vocals on "Peek-A-Boo"
Additional personnel
Larry Lynch — congas in "Hard to Get"
Mark Naftalin — piano on "Peek-A-Boo"
Technical
Glen Kolotkin - engineer "knobs, dials & switches"
Tom Lubin - assistant engineer
William Snyder - cover artwork

References 

1977 debut albums
The Rubinoos albums
Beserkley Records albums
Albums produced by Glen Kolotkin